La bellezza di Ippolita is a 1962 Italian comedy film directed by Giancarlo Zagni, starring Gina Lollobrigida and Enrico Maria Salerno. It was entered into the 12th Berlin International Film Festival.

Plot

Cast
 Gina Lollobrigida as Ippolita
 Enrico Maria Salerno as Luca
 Milva - Adriana
 Lars Bloch
 Angela Portaluri
 Bruno Scipioni
 Piero Palermini
 Franco Balducci
 Ariel Mannoni
 Renato Mambor
 Franco Giacobini
 Carlo Giuffrè

References

External links

1962 films
1960s Italian-language films
1962 comedy films
Italian black-and-white films
Commedia all'italiana
Films directed by Giancarlo Zagni
Films scored by Carlo Rustichelli
1962 directorial debut films
1960s Italian films